Adoption law is the generic area of legal theory, policy making, legal practice and legal studies relating to law on adoption.

National adoption laws
National, or domestic, adoption laws deal with issues such as step-parent adoption, adoption by cohabitees, adoption by single parents and LGBT adoption. Adoption laws in some countries may be affected by religious considerations such as adoption in Islam.

Specific laws
Laws vary widely from country to country and in the case of adoption in the United States, from state to state

Intercountry adoption laws

Intercountry adoption laws vary widely.

References

 
Family law